Joe Williams Live is a live album by Joe Williams featuring Cannonball Adderley's Septet recorded at  Fantasy Studios' Studio "A" in front of a live audience and released on the Fantasy label.

Reception
The Allmusic review by Scott Yanow awarded the album 4 stars and states that "the singer easily steals the show on a searing version of 'Goin' to Chicago Blues,' and his own 'Who She Do,' and a few unusual songs, including Duke Ellington's 'Heritage.

Track listing 
All compositions by Joe Williams except as indicated
 "Who She Do" - 4:23
 "On Green Dolphin Street" (Bronisław Kaper, Ned Washington) - 4:59
 "Heritage" (Duke Ellington) - 3:19
 "Sad Song" (Will Tilghman) - 4:40
 "Goin' to Chicago Blues" (Count Basie, Jimmy Rushing) - 6:45
 "A Beautiful Friendship" (Donald Kahn, Stanley Styne) - 3:20
 "Yesterday, Today and Tomorrow" (Tom McIntosh) - 3:39
 "Tell Me Where to Scratch (I Want to Love You Baby)" - 3:53
 "Medley: All Blues/Goin' to Chicago Blues/C.C. Rider" (Miles Davis/Basie, Rushing/Ma Rainey) - 9:48 Bonus track on CD reissue

Personnel 
Joe Williams - vocals
 Cannonball Adderley – alto saxophone
 Nat Adderley – cornet
  George Duke – piano, electric piano
 Walter Booker – bass, guitar
 Carol Kaye - electric bass
 Roy McCurdy – drums
King Errisson - congas

References 

1973 live albums
Joe Williams (jazz singer) albums
Fantasy Records live albums